LDEO is the Lamont–Doherty Earth Observatory at Columbia University in Palisades, New York.

LDEO may also refer to:

 Lunar-distance Earth orbit, see Lunar distance (astronomy)